Adino is a rural locality (a village) in Turgenevskoye Rural Settlement, Melenkovsky District, Vladimir Oblast, Russia. The population was 274 as of 2010. There are 3 streets.

Geography 
Adino is located 11 km northeast of Melenki (the district's administrative centre) by road. Savkovo is the nearest rural locality.

References 

Rural localities in Melenkovsky District
Melenkovsky Uyezd